Liceo José Victorino Lastarria (Spanish for: José Victorino Lastarria High School) may refer to:

 Liceo José Victorino Lastarria (Rancagua), Chile
 Liceo José Victorino Lastarria (Santiago), Chile